Sir Walter Richard Plummer (8 November 1858 – 10 December 1917) was a British politician and businessman who was Conservative MP for Newcastle-upon-Tyne, a two-member constituency at the time.

He won the seat with another Conservative in 1900, but they lost it to Liberal and Labour candidates in 1906. He was knighted in 1904.

Sources
The Liberal Year Book, 1907
Craig, FWS, ed. (1974). British Parliamentary Election Results: 1885–1918. London: Macmillan Press. 
Debrett's House of Commons & Judicial Bench, 1901
Whitaker's Almanack, 1901 to 1907 editions

Conservative Party (UK) MPs for English constituencies
Politics of Newcastle upon Tyne
1858 births
1917 deaths
Knights Bachelor
19th-century British businesspeople
20th-century British businesspeople
English justices of the peace

External links